Paul Sheedy (born 16 February 1981), is an Australian former professional rugby 
footballer. He played rugby league for the Melbourne Storm in 2001, and he played rugby union for the New South Wales Waratahs between 2001 and 2004.

Early life
Sheedy attended secondary school at Marist College Ashgrove in Brisbane, where he played rugby for Ashgrove's 1st XV team in 1997 and 1998. He was selected for the Australian Schoolboys team in 1998 and played scrum-half in the -winning team that defeated Scotland, Ireland, Wales and England on their 1998–99 tour.

Career

Rugby league
In 1999, Sheedy switched codes to play rugby league in the Queensland Cup for the Northern Suburbs Devils (then affiliated with Melbourne Storm). He made his NRL debut for the Melbourne Storm against the Bulldogs in 2001,  replacing the injured Robbie Ross at fullback.

Rugby union
Sheedy switched back to rugby union in the latter part of 2001, signing with the New South Wales Waratahs. In 2002, he was selected and played for the Australian team at the Under 21 Rugby World Championship held in Johannesburg.

He joined the Manly rugby club in Sydney, where he played in the Shute Shield competition between 2002 and 2005. Sheedy made his Super 12 debut off the bench for the Waratahs against the Auckland Blues in the opening round of the 2003 season.
He  returned to rugby league and played for South Perth Lions in the  Western Australian Rugby League.

References

1981 births
Living people
Australian people of Filipino descent
Australian rugby league players
Australian rugby union players
Melbourne Storm players
Norths Devils players
Philippines national rugby league team captains
Philippines national rugby league team coaches
Philippines national rugby league team players
Rugby league fullbacks
Rugby league players from Brisbane